Tsui Wan Yi (born 11 September 1984) is a fencer from Hong Kong, who won a bronze medal at the 2006 Asian Games in the women's sabre team competition.

References

1984 births
Living people
Hong Kong female sabre fencers
Place of birth missing (living people)
Asian Games medalists in fencing
Fencers at the 2002 Asian Games
Fencers at the 2006 Asian Games
Asian Games bronze medalists for Hong Kong
Medalists at the 2006 Asian Games
21st-century Hong Kong women